Kirovskoye is a rural locality (a settlement) in Oktyabrskoye Rural Settlement, Paninsky District, Voronezh Oblast, Russia. The population was 246 as of 2010. There are 6 streets.

Geography 
Kirovskoye is located 22 km southwest of Panino (the district's administrative centre) by road. Oktyabrsky is the nearest rural locality.

References 

Rural localities in Paninsky District